is the second single of the J-pop duo, W. It was released on August 4, 2004, under the Zetima label. This was the first single that W released after their graduation from Morning Musume. It is the highest selling single of all of the W singles. This song was used the last ending theme of the Doraemon 1979 anime.

Track listing 
 - 3:51
 - 3:52
 - 3:48

Personnel
Lyricist: Tsunku
Arranger: Shoichiro Hirata
Catalog No.: EPCE-5308

External links 
 UP-FRONT WORKS: W discography entry

W (group) songs
Zetima Records singles
2004 singles
Anime songs
Song recordings produced by Tsunku
2004 songs
Songs written by Tsunku
Doraemon mass media